Tecate is an unincorporated community in the Mountain Empire area of southeastern San Diego County, California, directly adjacent to the Mexican city of Tecate, Baja California. The area is best known for its border crossing between the United States and Mexico, and nearby Tecate Peak. It is affectionately known by the people of Tecate by the Spanish diminutive of "Tecatito" in account of its small size compared with Mexican Tecate.

References

Unincorporated communities in San Diego County, California
Mountain Empire (San Diego County)
Unincorporated communities in California